Gordon Douglas McLennan (1914–1966) was an Australian professional rugby league footballer who played in the 1930s and 1940s. An Australia national and New South Wales state representative forward, he played his club football in Sydney for Newtown (with whom he won the 1943 NSWRFL Premiership), as well as in country New South Wales.

Playing career

A local Newtown junior player, McLennan came through the ranks to become a first grade player in 1934. A wharf laborer throughout his life, McLennan was a feared front-row forward who played with Newtown for ten seasons between 1934-1937 and 1940–1945. His representative career was only one appearance for New South Wales in 1937, although he was selected to tour with the 1937/38 Kangaroos and played 16 minor matches. He is listed on the Australian Players Register as Kangaroo No. 211.

The highlight of McLennan's club career was winning the 1943 Grand Final with Newtown, partnering the iconic Frank 'Bumper' Farrell  in the front row.  McLennan also had a stint as captain-coach of Cooma rugby league club in 1938–1939.

Death
McLennan died on 4 January 1966 from a heart attack, age 51.

References

1914 births
1966 deaths
Australian rugby league players
Australia national rugby league team players
Newtown Jets players
New South Wales rugby league team players
Rugby league players from Sydney
Country New South Wales rugby league team players
Rugby league props